"My Cherie Amour" is a 1969 song by Motown singer-songwriter Stevie Wonder. The song reached number 4 on the Billboard pop chart in August to be Wonder's third Top Ten hit. The song was co-written by Wonder, Sylvia Moy, and Henry Cosby; Cosby also served as producer of the song. At the end of 1969, the song was ranked number 32 for the year.

Background
The kernel of the song, originally titled "Oh, My Marsha" (or Marcia), was written in one hour in 1966 about a girlfriend of Wonder's at the Michigan School for the Blind in Lansing, Michigan. Tamla Records founder Berry Gordy listened to the song, and he thought it could be improved with more development. Motown songwriters Henry Cosby and Sylvia Moy collaborated on the song with Wonder; Moy came up with the intriguing title, a combination of English and French in a manner reminiscent of the Beatles' "Michelle" which was a massive hit in 1966.

The song's instruments (with the exceptions of the horns and the strings) were recorded on November 8, 1967, at Hitsville USA. On November 17, the horns and strings were added at Golden World Records, one year before it was acquired by Motown. Wonder's vocals were added on January 15, 1968. The song was shelved for a year, first appearing as the B-side of the single "I Don't Know Why", on January 28, 1969, timed to extend the chart performance of Wonder's album For Once in My Life, from which the single came. Motown promoted "I Don't Know Why" enough that it peaked at number 39 on the pop charts in March 1969, but many radio deejays were also flipping over the record and playing "My Cherie Amour". Wonder fell off the Hot 100 chart in April and most of May, but fan response to "My Cherie Amour" was building, and Tamla re-released the song for radio as the A-side. This song entered the Hot 100 on May 31 at number 70. It climbed for two months, and peaked at number 4 in the first week of August. At the same time, the song hit number 4 in the R&B charts. Wonder also released Spanish- and Italian-language versions titled "Mi Querido Amor" and "My Cherie Amor", respectively.

In June and July during the song's chart ascent in the US, Wonder was in the UK on tour. (He was also dating one of the dancers in his backing group, the Flirtations.) Motown saw an opportunity, and released "My Cherie Amour" as a single in the UK. The song entered British pop charts in late July, and five weeks later it had again hit number 4, this time holding position for three weeks straight. The total chart run was 15 weeks in the UK. 

Cash Box described it as "a haunting ballad with a slight Latin underbeat."

The success of the song spurred Motown to program an album around it, filled with love songs. The album, My Cherie Amour, was released on August 29, 1969, with the title track leading Side 1. Most of the album is filler material: songs recently made famous by other artists, and some show tunes. But the single "Yester-Me, Yester-You, Yesterday" performed very well, hitting number 5 on the R&B chart at Thanksgiving 1969, and number 7 on the pop charts two weeks later.

Legacy
In 2014 "My Cherie Amour" was sampled by British DJ Philip George for his single "Wish You Were Mine" which topped the UK Dance Chart.

Chart performance

Weekly charts

Year-end charts

References

1969 songs
1969 singles
Songs written by Henry Cosby
Songs written by Sylvia Moy
Songs written by Stevie Wonder
Stevie Wonder songs
Tamla Records singles
Pop ballads
Song recordings produced by Henry Cosby